Eduard Marian Florescu (born 27 June 1997) is a Romanian professional footballer who plays as a midfielder for Liga I club FC Botoșani.

Club career

Mioveni
Florescu started his career at Mioveni, club for which he played five years before signing for Viitorul Constanța in the summer of 2018.

Viitorul Constanța
In the summer of 2018, Florescu joined Liga I club Viitorul Constanța. Florescu left Viitorul before playing any match and signed with FC Botoșani.

Botoșani
In August 2022, Florescu joined Liga I club Botoșani.

Argeș Pitești (loan)
In January 2019, Florescu joined Argeș Pitești on loan from Botoșani.

Universitatea Craiova
On 5 September 2022, Florescu joined Liga I club Universitatea Craiova on a two-year deal, with an option to extend for a further year.

References

External links
 
 
 
 
 
 

1997 births
Living people
Sportspeople from Pitești
Romanian footballers
Association football midfielders
Liga I players
FC Viitorul Constanța players
FC Botoșani players
CS Universitatea Craiova players
Liga II players
CS Mioveni players
FC Argeș Pitești players
Olympic footballers of Romania
Footballers at the 2020 Summer Olympics